Delta/Delta Heritage Air Park  is located  east of Delta, British Columbia, Canada.

See also
 List of airports in the Lower Mainland

References

External links
Delta Heritage Airpark

Airports in Greater Vancouver
Registered aerodromes in British Columbia
Buildings and structures in Delta, British Columbia
Transport in Delta, British Columbia